Klæbo is a Norwegian surname. Notable people with the surname include:

Arthur Klæbo (1908–1985), Norwegian journalist
Johannes Høsflot Klæbo (born 1996), Norwegian cross-country skier

Norwegian-language surnames